Jonathan Lazare Alperin (born 1937) is an American mathematician specializing in the area of algebra known as group theory. He is notable for his work in group theory which has been cited over 500 times according to the Mathematical Reviews.  The Alperin–Brauer–Gorenstein theorem is named after him.

Biography
Alperin attended school at Princeton University and wrote his Ph.D. dissertation in 1961 "On a Special Class of Regular p-Groups" under the direction of Graham Higman.  He was awarded a Guggenheim Fellowship in 1974.  He has several times (1969, 1979, and 1983) been a visiting scholar at the Institute for Advanced Study. In 2012 he became a fellow of the American Mathematical Society.

Alperin was a professor at the University of Chicago. He has published over 60
papers and his work has been cited over 500 times.

He is also known for his conjecture, a topic of current research in modular representation theory, and for his work on the local control of fusion, part of local group theory. In , the Alperin–Brauer–Gorenstein theorem was proven, giving the classification of finite simple groups with quasi-dihedral Sylow 2-subgroups.

Selected bibliography

References

External links
 Mathematical Reviews author profile
 
 Home page at Chicago
 Short biography in the Notices of the AMS

20th-century American mathematicians
21st-century American mathematicians
Group theorists
Institute for Advanced Study visiting scholars
University of Chicago faculty
Princeton University alumni
1937 births
Living people
Fellows of the American Mathematical Society